The 2017–18 Nashville Predators season was the 20th season for the National Hockey League franchise that was established on June 25, 1997. The team reached the playoffs for the fourth consecutive season, and went from the worst team to qualify for the playoffs the season before to the NHL's top team, winning the Central Division and winning the Presidents' Trophy, both for the first time in team history. However, the Predators were eliminated in the Second Round of the playoffs, as they were upset by the Winnipeg Jets, losing in seven games.

Standings

Schedule and results

Preseason
The preseason schedule was published on June 19, 2017.

Regular season
The regular season schedule was released on June 22, 2017.

Playoffs

Player statistics
Final Stats

Skaters

Goaltenders

†Denotes player spent time with another team before joining the Predators. Stats reflect time with the Predators only.
‡Traded mid-season. Stats reflect time with the Predators only.
Bold/italics denotes franchise record

Transactions
The Predators have been involved in the following transactions during the 2017–18 season.

Trades

Free agents acquired

Free agents lost

Claimed via waivers

Lost via waivers

Players released

Lost via retirement

Player signings

Draft picks

Below are the Nashville Predators' selections at the 2017 NHL Entry Draft, which was held on June 23 and 24, 2017 at the United Center in Chicago.

Draft notes:
 The New York Rangers' sixth-round pick went to the Nashville Predators as the result of a trade on July 1, 2015, that sent Magnus Hellberg to New York in exchange for this pick.

References

Nashville Predators seasons
Nashville Predators
Presidents' Trophy seasons
Nashville Predators
Nashville Predators